The Aliağa branch is a  long double track railway from Menemen to Aliağa just north of Izmir. The branch was built in 1996 to service the industrial area just south of the port town of Aliağa. The line branches off the Izmir-Afyon railway at Menemen, then turns north traveling over the relatively flat Gediz plain. The Northern Line of the commuter railroad, İZBAN, is the only passenger service that uses the line.

History

Railway lines in Turkey
Railway lines opened in 1996